Ostuj (also Romanized as Ostūj) is a village in Qareh Chay Rural District, in the Central District of Saveh County, Markazi Province, Iran. At the 2006 census, its population was 269, in 59 families.

References 

Populated places in Saveh County